Lamb is a surname, and may refer to
 Alan Lamb (musician), Australian musician and sculptor
 Alexander Crawford Lamb, Scottish hotelier and collector
 Allan Lamb, South African and MCC cricketer
 Amanda Lamb, British television presenter
 Andrew Lamb (disambiguation), several people, including
 Andrew Lamb (bishop) (c. 1565–1634), Scottish bishop
 Lamb's House, historic house in Leith, Scotland, built by Andrew Lamb
 Andrew Lamb (cricketer) (born 1978), New Zealand cricketer
 Andrew Lamb (musician) (born 1958), jazz musician
 Andrew Lamb (writer) (born 1942), British writer on musical theatre and light music
 Andy Lamb (Wisconsin politician), American politician
 Annabel Lamb, British singer-songwriter
 Anthony Lamb, botanist
 Anthony Lamb (basketball) (born 1998), American basketball player
 Sir Archie Lamb (1921–2021), British ambassador, writer
 Barry Douglas Lamb, British musician
 Ben Lamb (actor) (born 1989), English actor
 Ben Lamb (poker player) (born 1985), American professional poker player
 Benjamin Lamb, English organist
 Bobby Lamb (American football) (born 1962), college football coach
 Bobby Lamb (trombonist) (born 1931), Irish jazz musician
 Brian Lamb, American television personality, co-founder of C-SPAN
 Cainon Lamb, American music producer
 Lady Caroline Lamb (1785–1828), wife of William Lamb, 2nd Viscount Melbourne and lover of Lord Byron
 Caroline Lamb, British accountant and health administrator
 CeeDee Lamb (born 1999), American football player
 Charles Lamb (disambiguation), several people
 Sir Charles Lamb, 2nd Baronet of the Lamb Baronets
 Charles Lamb (actor) (1900–1989), British actor
 Charles Lamb (cricketer) (born 1972), English cricketer
 Charles Lamb (politician) (1891–1965), Canadian politician
 Charles Lamb (Royal Navy officer) (1914–1981)
 Charles Lamb (writer) (1775–1834), British essayist
 Charles Rollinson Lamb (1860–1942), American architect and artist
 Christina Lamb, British journalist and author
 Christopher Lamb (journalist), British journalist
 Chuck Lamb, American television personality
 Danny Lamb (born 1995), English cricketer
 Dave Lamb, English actor, presenter, comedian and voice actor
 Dominick Lamb, birth name of hip-hop producer Nottz
 Donald Lamb, Canadian airline executive
 Doron Lamb (born 1992), American basketball player
 Dwayne Lamb, Australian rules footballer
 Edmund Lamb, British Liberal Party politician
 Edward Lamb, American labor lawyer
 Elizabeth Lamb, Viscountess Melbourne, wife of Peniston Lamb, 1st Viscount Melbourne
 Elspeth Lamb (born 1951), Scottish artist
 Emily Lamb, Countess Cowper, sister to Prime Minister Lord Melbourne
 Emma Lamb (born 1997), English cricketer
 Eugene M. Lamb, American politician
 Euphemia Lamb, artists' model, married to Henry Lamb
 Floyd Lamb, American politician
 Francis Lamb, American politician
 George Lamb, British disc jockey and television presenter
 Greg Lamb, Zimbabwean cricketer
 Harold Lamb, American novelist and historical writer
 Henry Lamb, Australian-born English painter of the Camden Town Group and London Group
 Horace Lamb, British hydrodynamicist
 Hubert Lamb, British climatologist
 Jan Lamb, Hong Kong DJ and singer
 Jake Lamb (born 1990),American baseball player
 Jeremy Lamb (born 1992), American basketball player
 Jerry Lamb, Hong Kong actor
 Joe Lamb (1906–1982), ice hockey forward
 Joseph Lamb (disambiguation), several people, including
 Joseph Lamb (composer) (1887–1960), American composer of ragtime music
 Joseph Lamb (footballer), English football manager
 Joseph Lamb (politician) (1873–1949), British politician
 Joseph Fairweather Lamb (1928–2015), Scottish physician
 Kirsty Lamb (born 1994), Australian rules footballer
 Larry Lamb (actor), British actor
 Larry Lamb (newspaper editor), British journalist
 Lily Lamb, Disney fictional character
 Marcus Lamb, American television evangelist
 Mary Lamb, British writer, sister of Charles Lamb
 Mathew Charles Lamb, Canadian spree killer
 Michael Lamb (psychologist), Professor of Psychology, Cambridge University
 Mike Lamb, American baseball player
 Norman Lamb (born 1957), British politician
 Norman Lamb (American politician) (1935–2018), American lawyer and politician
 Lady Pansy Lamb, Anglo-Irish writer and translator
 Paul Lamb (musician) (born 1955), British blues harmonica player and bandleader
 Peniston Lamb, 1st Viscount Melbourne
 Ryan Lamb, English rugby player
 Robert Lamb (disambiguation), several people, including
 Robert Lamb (bishop) (1703–1769), English churchman, bishop of Peterborough
 Robert Lamb (footballer) (born 1955), Australian rules footballer
 Robert Lamb (martyr), one of the Perth Martyrs
 Robert A. Lamb (born 1950), British American virologist
 Robert E. Lamb (born 1936), U.S. diplomat
Sarah Lamb, American ballet dancer
Sydney Lamb, American linguist
Terry Lamb, Australian rugby league player
Thomas Lamb (disambiguation), several people, including
 Thomas Lamb (industrial designer) (1896–1988), American textile and industrial designer, children's book illustrator
 Thomas F. Lamb (1922–2015), American politician (Pennsylvania State Senator and State House of Representatives)
 Thomas W. Lamb (1871–1942), Scottish-born American theater and cinema architect
 Tim Lamb, British cricket administrator
 Todd Lamb, Canadian airline executive of Lambair
 Tom Lamb (artist) (1928–2016), British coal miner and artist
 Tom Lamb (businessman), Manitoba businessman, founder of Lamb Air
 Tom Lamb (footballer) (born 1996), Australian rules footballer 
 Tyler Lamb, Thai-American basketball player
 Wally Lamb, American author
 Walt Lamb (1920–1991), American football player
 William Lamb (disambiguation), several people, including
 William Lamb, pseudonym of Storm Jameson (1891–1986), English journalist and author
 William Lamb, 2nd Viscount Melbourne (1779–1848), British Prime Minister
 William Lamb (Confederate States Army officer) (1835–1909)
 William Lamb (sculptor) (1893–1951), Scottish artist
 William Lamb alias Paniter (died 1550), Scottish author
 William F. Lamb (1883–1952), designer of the Empire State Building
 William Kaye Lamb (1904–1999), Canadian historian
 Willis Lamb, American physicist (Lamb shift)
 Winifred Lamb (1894–1963), English archeologist

First name
Lamb Lennon Gaede (1992–), American singer (member of White Nationalist band Prussian Blue)

See also
Lamb (disambiguation)

English-language surnames